The Women Basketball Friendship Adriatic League, shortly WBFAL, was a regional basketball league featuring female teams from Montenegro, Bosnia and Herzegovina and Croatia.

History

Finals

Champions

External links
 
 Profile at eurobasket.com

  
Defunct women's basketball leagues in Europe
Sports leagues established in 2012
Defunct multi-national basketball leagues in Europe
2012 establishments in Europe
Basketball leagues in Croatia
Basketball leagues in Bosnia and Herzegovina
Basketball leagues in Montenegro
Women's basketball competitions in Croatia
Women's basketball competitions in Bosnia and Herzegovina
Women's basketball competitions in Montenegro
Multi-national women's basketball leagues in Europe